Purley Downs Golf Club Halt railway station served the Purley Downs golf club area of Purley, London Borough of Croydon, England, from 1914 to 1927 on the Oxted line.

History
The station was opened in 1914 by the South Eastern Railway. It closed in 1927.

References

Disused railway stations in the London Borough of Croydon
Railway stations in Great Britain opened in 1914
Railway stations in Great Britain closed in 1927
1914 establishments in England
1927 disestablishments in England